Poppy is a 1936 comedy film starring W. C. Fields and Rochelle Hudson. The film was based on a 1923 stage revue of the same name starring Fields and Madge Kennedy. This was the second film version of the revue featuring Fields, following Sally of the Sawdust in 1925 with Carol Dempster in the title role.

Plot
Eustace McGargle , a con artist, snake oil salesman and shell game trickster, tries to escape the sheriff while taking care of his beloved adopted daughter Poppy, who, after pretending to be an heiress to win an inheritance, is found to be an actual heiress.

Cast
W. C. Fields as Professor Eustace McGargle
Rochelle Hudson as Poppy
Richard Cromwell as Billy Farnsworth
Catherine Doucet as Countess Maggi Tubbs DePuizzi
Lynne Overman as Attorney Whiffen
Granville Bates as Mayor Farnsworth
Maude Eburne as Sarah Tucker
Bill Wolfe as Egmont
Adrian Morris as Constable Bowman
Rosalind Keith as Frances Parker
Ralph Remley as Carnival Manager

Production
Fields was suffering the effects of his heavy drinking and he injured his back during the making of the film. As a result, his performance may have suffered. Fields was ill during the production, and a fairly obvious double was used in several scenes requiring physical exertion.

Reception
In a contemporary review for The New York Times, critic Frank Nugent called Poppy a "glorious victory" for Fields and for comedy while conceding that the scenes without Fields were "painfully frail" and would provoke some squirming and eye-rolling.

Writing for The Spectator in 1936, Graham Greene offered a positive review, commenting that "Mr. Fields has never acted better." Comparing Fields' characterization to those of Charlie Chaplin, Greene noted that Fields "wins our hearts not by a display of Chaplin sentiment, not by class solidarity (he robs the poor as promptly as the rich), but simply by the completeness of his dishonesty."

Awards
"Never give a sucker an even break" was nominated for the American Film Institute's 2005 list AFI's 100 Years...100 Movie Quotes.

References

External links

1936 films
1936 comedy films
American comedy films
American black-and-white films
Circus films
Films directed by A. Edward Sutherland
Paramount Pictures films
1930s American films